The Verein für Hamburgische Geschichte (VHG) is a historical society founded on 9 April 1839, which is open to both professional historians and historically interested laypersons.

History 

The first chairman of the society, which 62 people joined on the day of its foundation, was until 1865 the historian and Senate archivist Johann Martin Lappenberg. The number of members rose to 242 by the end of the year.

From 1937, the archival councillor and later short-term head of the  Kurt Detlev Möller as the first chairman. Möller swore the association to hostility towards the Jews in a lecture. To the 18 remaining Jewish members he sent a form in which they were to confirm their "Aryan" origin. Möller came under public criticism after 1945. This occurred not because of his antisemitism, but because in a publication on the surrender of Hamburg he criticised the Reichsstatthalter and Gauleiter Karl Kaufmann, who had been in office throughout the Third Reich and was jointly responsible for all crimes in Hamburg, and the entire National Socialist leadership of Hamburg in his post-war account Das letzte Kapitel. Geschichte der Kapitulation Hamburgs with a mild account partially absolved of guilt and responsibility. This process led to the removal of Kurt Detlev Möller from his post as Head of the State Archives, which he had just taken up, by the Free Hanseatic City of Hamburg. However, the Verein für Hamburgische Geschichte stood by its chairman and kept him in his post until 1957. His Jewish members who were expelled at that time were only commemorated by the association in November 2007 during an extraordinary general meeting.

The VHG celebrated its 175th birthday on 9 April 2014 with a ceremony at Hamburg City Hall. The keynote speech was given by the New York historian Volker Berghahn, who grew up in Hamburg. From April 2014 to March 2015, a travelling exhibition entitled "Anchored in the City - 175 Years of the Verein für Hamburgische Geschichte" was shown at several public places in Hamburg.

In 2019, the association has around 1143 members, including the historians Frank Bajohr, Hans-Werner Goetz, Joist Grolle, Rainer Hering, Franklin Kopitzsch, Wolfgang Kopitzsch, Hans-Dieter Loose, Angelika Schaser and Barbara Vogel. The current chairperson is Rainer Nicolaysen. Vice-chairman is Dirk Brietzke. The Verein für Hamburgische Geschichte is one of the few German history and antiquities societies in Germany that can boast a young department.

Over time, various contributions and presentations have appeared on the history of the association itself.

Since 1864, the association has awarded the Lappenberg Medal.

Working groups and association activities 
Library Committee
The library of the VHG comprises about 13,000 volumes (as of 2020) on the history of Hamburg, its districts and neighbouring regions as well as the Hanseatic League. The Library Committee has the task of administering the library, taking in new books, cataloguing and signing them, arranging the holdings, deciding on new acquisitions, accepting donations (for example from budget liquidations), repairing damaged books. There are exchange partnerships with a number of Hamburg and non-Hamburg institutions for the exchange of new publications. The numerous duplicates from donations are offered to the members of the association in a book flea market. The holdings of the association's library have not yet been entered in the union catalogue of Hamburg libraries. The books can be viewed and borrowed on site in the association's rooms at the State Archives.

Historical Excursions Committee
The Committee for Historical Excursions cultivates the knowledge of Hamburg's history and its research in excursions and tours. These tours or trips are each prepared and led by two members of the committee and, depending on the topic, supplemented and supported by experts. The spectrum ranges from theme-related walks and bicycle tours, museum tours to round trips of several days through northern Germany or abroad.

Working Group "Young Association"
In order to counter a foreseeable ageing and loss of members, the VHG started in 2013 to recruit members among students and pupils (among others, the membership fee is waived for members up to the age of 28). The "younger" members (about 14–40 years old) meet regularly for regulars' evenings after museum tours and lectures. Recurring events include the colloquium "From the BA thesis to the dissertation", self-organised museum visits and further training, as well as participation in pub quizzes. According to a study published in 2016, a good 200 of the 1,100 members belonged to the "young association" working group at that time.

Working Group on Remembrance
From 2007 to 2017, members of the VHG met to report, discuss and write down their personal memories on various topics. During this time, the work of the working group has resulted in several books dealing with topics such as Living in Hamburg, School Days in Hamburg or "Essen und Trinken in Hamburg".

Stumbling Stone Research Group
From 2013 to 2017, a group consisting mainly of association members researched the biographies of Nazi victims for whom Stolpersteine have been laid in the Grindel district of Hamburg-Rotherbaum.

Publications 
One of the main fields of activity of the VHG is the editing and publication of writings on the history of Hamburg.

The main publication is the annual  (ZHG). Essays, research reports and reviews are published in the journal. The members' magazine Tiedenkieker - Hamburgische Geschichtsblätter, also published annually, contains smaller contributions on persons, institutions and events from Hamburg's history, as well as news from the life of the association. The predecessor of the Tiedenkieker was initially the Mitteilungen des Vereins für Hamburgische Geschichte (MHG), which was replaced in 1926 by the Hamburgische Geschichts- und Heimatblätter (HGH).

In addition to the periodicals, the ZHG also publishes scientific research literature and special publications in loose succession. Since 1969, the series Beiträge zur Geschichte Hamburgs has been published with 68 volumes so far (as of 2020). The books of the Hamburgische Lebensbilder have been published in 25 volumes so far.

Chairpersons 
 1839–1865 Johann Martin Lappenberg
 1867–1872 Wilhelm Hübbe
 1872–1888 Johann Friedrich Voigt
 1888–1912 Theodor Schrader
 1912–1937 Hans Nirrnheim
 1937–1957 Kurt Detlev Möller
 1957–1974 Jürgen Bolland
 1975–2005 Hans-Dieter Loose
 2005–2007 Udo Schäfer
 2007–2011 Joist Grolle
 seit 2011 Rainer Nicolaysen

References

Further reading 
 Peter Gabrielsson: "... anstelle einer Historischen Kommission". Zum Zusammenwirken von Staatsarchiv und Verein für Hamburgische Geschichte. In Hans W. Eckardt (ed.): Zwischen Verwaltung und Wissenschaft. Beiträge zur Geschichte und Gegenwart des Staatsarchivs Hamburg (Beiträge zur Geschichte Hamburgs. Bd. 26). Hamburg 1985, .
 Joist Grolle, Ina S. Lorenz: Der Ausschluss der jüdischen Mitglieder aus dem Verein für Hamburgische Geschichte. Ein lange beschwiegenes Kapitel der NS-Zeit. (Mit biografischem Anhang). In Zeitschrift des Vereins für Hamburgische Geschichte vol. 93 (2007), . (online)
 Joist Grolle, Matthias Schmoock (ed.): Spätes Gedenken. Ein Geschichtsverein erinnert sich seiner ausgeschlossenen jüdischen Mitglieder (Hamburgische Lebensbilder vol. 21). Ed. Temmen, Bremen 2009, .
 Renate Hauschild-Thiessen: 150 Jahre Verein für Hamburgische Geschichte. In Zeitschrift des Vereins für Hamburgische Geschichte vol. 76 (1990),  (online).
 Sebastian Husen: Vaterstädtische Geschichte im republikanischen Stadtstaat. Studien zur Entwicklung des Vereins für Hamburgische Geschichte (1839–1914) (Veröffentlichungen des Vereins für Hamburgische Geschichte. Vol. 45). Hamburg 1999, .
 Hans-Dieter Loose: Kontinuität und Wandel. Die letzten 50 Jahre des Vereins für Hamburgische Geschichte. In: Zeitschrift des Vereins für Hamburgische Geschichte vol. 74/75 (1989),  (online).
 Rainer Nicolaysen (ed.): 175 Jahre Verein für Hamburgische Geschichte. Dokumentation des Senatsempfangs am Großen Festsaal des Hamburger Rathauses am 9 April 2014. Hamburg 2014-
 Gunnar B. Zimmermann: Bürgerliche Geschichtswelten in einer modernen Metropole. Der Verein für Hamburgische Geschichte in den Jahren 1912 bis 1974. E-Dissertation Hamburg 2018 (online)
 Gunnar B. Zimmermann: Bürgerliche Geschichtswelten im Nationalsozialismus. Der Verein für Hamburgische Geschichte zwischen Beharrung und Selbstmobilisierung (Beiträge zur Geschichte Hamburgs. Vol. 67). Wallstein, Göttingen 2019, .

History of Hamburg
1839 establishments in Germany